Destry Rides Again is a 1939 western film starring James Stewart.

Destry Rides Again may also refer to:

 Destry Rides Again (1932 film), starring Tom Mix
 Destry Rides Again (Randy Weston album)
 Destry Rides Again (Roland Hanna album)
 Destry Rides Again (musical), by Harold Rome and Leonard Gershe
 Destry Rides Again (novel), by Max Brand

See also 
 Destry (disambiguation)